George Abraham Crady (born June 14, 1931) is an American politician in the state of Florida.

He was born in 1931 in Miami, and attended Duke University (B.A. 1953) and Jones Business College. After university, he was a helicopter pilot in the United States Marine Corps from 1954 to 1957.

He served in the Florida House of Representatives, as a Democrat, representing Nassau County (15th District) from 1977 to November 2, 1982, 13th district from November 2, 1982, to November 3, 1992, and the 12th district from November 3, 1992, to November 7, 2000. He is a Democrat. Crady also has served as a member of Nassau County School Advisory Board from 1974 to 1976, also serving in the capacity of president from 1975 to 1976.

A Methodist, Crady is married to Virginia Lee Roerig of Jacksonville and has six daughters. He is a businessman.

Legislative positions held
House Parliamentarian 1988–1994
Rules Reform Chairman, Rules & Calendar Committee Vice Chairman 1988–1992
Chairman of the Duval County Legislative Delegation 1989–1990
Ethics & Elections Committee Chairman 1986–1988
Rules, Resolutions, & Ethics Committee Co-Chair 1997–1998

Awards received
Yulee PTA Citizen of the Year, 1971
League of Cities Quality Floridian Award 1990
AARP Outstanding Service to the Community Award 1994
Small County Coalition Outstanding Legislative Service Award 1994
Florida Chamber of Commerce Roll Call Award 1994

References

Democratic Party members of the Florida House of Representatives
1931 births
Living people
Politicians from Miami
Duke University alumni
Businesspeople from Florida
People from Yulee, Florida